The Fisherman's Bride is a 1909 American silent film directed by Francis Boggs. It was the first commercial film made in the U.S. state of Oregon that had a plot.

Plot

Production
The Fisherman's Bride was shot in Astoria, Oregon at the mouth of the Columbia River, in August 1909. A 1909 newspaper article denotes the film as consisting of  worth of reels.

References

External links

1909 films
American silent short films
Films shot in Astoria, Oregon
Films set in Astoria, Oregon
Selig Polyscope Company films
Films set in Oregon
Films shot in Oregon
1900s American films